Centro Santa Fe (English: Santa Fe Center or Santa Fe Mall), often incorrectly named  "Centro Comercial Santa Fe", is a large  enclosed shopping mall in the Santa Fe area of Cuajimalpa, Mexico City. Centro Santa Fe is the largest shopping center in Mexico. The original mall, cost 270 billion old Mexican pesos (270 million current pesos) in 1993. It was further expanded in 2012.

Within the Centro Santa Fe, two floors above the Sears wing are separately branded as Vía Santa Fe, containing mid-luxury clothing retailers (e.g. Salvatore Ferragamo, La Martina, Dolce & Gabbana), a Cinemex "Platinum" luxury multi-cinema, Casa Palacio (home store run by El Palacio de Hierro), and Mexico's first Apple Store.

Anchors in the main mall are El Palacio de Hierro, Liverpool, Sanborns and Sears department stores, and a Chedraui Select hypermarket.

As a whole, the mall has about 500 stores in total.

As of 2012 the center as a whole had about 1,500,000 visitors per month or 20 million per year.

References

External links
 Official website

Shopping malls in Greater Mexico City
Cuajimalpa